The Tootell House (also called King's Row or Hedgerow) is a house at 1747 Mooresfield Road in Kingston, Rhode Island that is listed on the National Register of Historic Places.

The two-story, wood-shingled Colonial Revival house on a  tract was designed by Gunther and Bemis Associates of Boston for Fred Tootell. It was built in 1932–1933, while Tootell was married to his first wife Anne Parsons. House design was by John J. G. Gunther. Elizabeth Clark Gunther was the landscape architect for the grounds.

See also
National Register of Historic Places listings in Washington County, Rhode Island

References

Houses completed in 1933
Houses in South Kingstown, Rhode Island
Houses on the National Register of Historic Places in Rhode Island
National Register of Historic Places in Washington County, Rhode Island
Colonial Revival architecture in Rhode Island
1933 establishments in Rhode Island